Alfred Machin may refer to:

 Alfred Machin (director) (1877–1929), French film director
 Alfred Machin (writer) (1888–?), British writer